Hranice (or Mährisch Weißkirchen) is a town in Přerov District in the Olomouc Region of the Czech Republic. It has about 17,000 inhabitants. The historic town centre is well preserved and is protected by law as an urban monument zone. The town is known for the Hranice Abyss.

Administrative parts
Hranice is made up of nine town parts and villages:

Hranice I-Město
Hranice II-Lhotka
Hranice III-Velká
Hranice IV-Drahotuše
Hranice V-Rybáře
Hranice VI-Valšovice
Hranice VII-Slavíč
Hranice VIII-Středolesí
Hranice IX-Uhřínov

Středolesí and Uhřínov form an exclave of the municipal territory.

Etymology
The name Hranice literally means "border". It is sometimes called Hranice na Moravě ("Hranice in Moravia") to distinguish from other places with the same name.

Geography
It lies mostly in the Moravian Gate lowland. The Bečva River flows through the town.

History

The first written mention of Hranice is in a falsificated document from 1169, according to the trusted sources Hranice already existed at the end of the 12th century. In 1276, Hranice became a town. From 1420s, the town became a property of Cimburk family, and from 1499 a property of Pernštejn family. In 16th and 17th centuries, the manor often changed owners.

Until 1918, Hranice was part of the Austrian monarchy (Austria side after the compromise of 1867), in the district with the same name, one of the 34 Bezirkshauptmannschaften in Moravia.
The German name only was used before 1867 (including Weiskirchen).

In the days of Austria-Hungary, in the interbellum Czechoslovakia, and during the communist era the city hosted a large military academy. Notable graduates include Archduke Wilhelm of Austria and Herman Potočnik.

Jewish population

The first Jews came in 1611, receiving in 1637 the right for a self-governed Jewish quarter, around the present Janáčkova street (renamed from Židovská street). Besides those 17 houses, they were not allowed to purchase houses elsewhere. The community reached a high 802 people in 1857 (13% of the entire town). They had a significant role in the development of Hranice's industry: a textile plant established in 1844 (the largest factory until the mid-20th century), and distilleries (1827, 1836).

Demographics

Economy

In 1883, Antonín Kunz founded a company in Hranice that specialized in the production of windpumps and other pumps. The company became the largest factory for water pumps in Austria-Hungary. At the end of the 19th century, it also produced complete communal water systems that were in towns and cities in the whole Austria-Hungary. The Sigma Pumps company developed out of Kunz's company.

The largest employer in the town is SSI Schäfer.

Transport
Hranice lies on the railway from Přerov to Vsetín. The town is served by train stations Hranice na Moravě, Hranice na Moravě město, and Drahotuše. In the municipal territory is also located the Teplice nad Bečvou station, which serves this neighbouring municipality.

The D1 motorway leading from Přerov to Ostrava bypasses the town in the north.

Sights

Since 1992, the historic town centre is protected as an urban monument zone. The church of the Beheading of Saint John the Baptist is the landmark of the town square. The construction was finished in 1763. It is a massive Baroque-Neoclassical building with valuable decorations of the interior. The second significant building on the square is the old town hall. It served its purpose until 1998, when the offices moved to the premises of the castle. Today it serves as a library, a museum, and a concert hall.

The Hranice Castle was formerly a Gothic castle of Cimburk lords. In 16th–17th centuries it was rebuilt in the Renaissance style. Today it serves as the town hall, museum and gallery.

The Jewish community is commemorated by several monuments. The original small synagogue was replaced in 1863 by new larger building in Moorish-Byzantine style. It is used for cultural purposes. The Jewish cemetery was used until 1965. The oldest preserved tombstone is from 1685.

The most valuable technical monument are the Hranice Viaducts. The oldest one is from 1844–1846.

Notable people

Daniel Strejc-Vetterus (1592–1669), priest of the Unity of the Brethren
Aaron Chorin (1766–1844), Hungarian rabbi
Baruch Placzek (1834–1922), rabbi and author
Isidore Singer (1859–1939), author and editor
Franz Petrak (1886–1973), Austrian-Czech mycologist
Albert Kutal (1904–1976), historian
Helmut Otto Hofer (1912–1989), Austrian anatomist and zoologist
Jiří Brdečka (1917–1982), writer
Ivan Sviták (1925–1994), philosopher and poet
Dalibor Janda (born 1962), singer
Aleš Opata (born 1964), military leader

Twin towns – sister cities

Hranice is twinned with:
 Hlohovec, Slovakia
 Konstancin-Jeziorna, Poland
 Leidschendam-Voorburg, Netherlands
 Slovenske Konjice, Slovenia

See also
The Confusions of Young Törless, a novel based on experience in the Hranice military academy

References

External links

 

Cities and towns in the Czech Republic
Populated places in Přerov District
Jewish communities in the Czech Republic
Shtetls